Equatorial Guinea is a country located in Central Africa, with an area of . Formerly the colony of Spanish Guinea, its post-independence name evokes its location near both the Equator and the Gulf of Guinea. The discovery of large oil reserves in 1996 and its subsequent exploitation have contributed to a dramatic increase in government revenue. , Equatorial Guinea is the third-largest oil producer in Sub-Saharan Africa.

Forestry, farming, and fishing are also major components of GDP. Subsistence farming predominates. The deterioration of the rural economy under successive brutal regimes has diminished any potential for agriculture-led growth.

Notable firms 
This list includes notable companies with primary headquarters located in the country. The industry and sector follow the Industry Classification Benchmark taxonomy. Organizations which have ceased operations are included and noted as defunct.

See also 
 List of airlines of Equatorial Guinea
 List of banks in Equatorial Guinea

References 

 
Equatorial Guinea